Symmerista albifrons, the white-headed prominent or orange-humped oakworm, is a species of moth in the family Notodontidae (the prominents). It was first described by J. E. Smith in 1797 and it is found in North America.

The MONA or Hodges number for Symmerista albifrons is 7951.

References

Further reading

External links

 

Notodontidae
Articles created by Qbugbot
Moths described in 1797